Ivan Lendl defeated Jeff Turpin in the final, 6–3, 6–4 to win the boys' singles tennis title at the 1978 Wimbledon Championships.

Seeds

  Ivan Lendl (champion)
  Per Hjertquist (semifinals)
  Ramesh Krishnan (third round)
  Stefan Simonsson (quarterfinals)
  Robbie Venter (semifinals)
  Bill Gilmour Jr. (first round)
  John Corse (quarterfinals)
  Blaine Willenborg (quarterfinals)

Draw

Finals

Top half

Section 1

Section 2

Bottom half

Section 3

Section 4

References

External links

Boys' Singles
Wimbledon Championship by year – Boys' singles